This is a list of U.S. states and the District of Columbia by research and development (R&D) spending in 2016 adjusted USD.

List 
States by R&D spending, spending per capita and federal government spending as percentage of total R&D spending.

See also 
List of countries by research and development spending

References 

States by research and development spending
research and development spending
United States, research and development spending